Beralade obliquata is a moth of the family Lasiocampidae first described by Johann Christoph Friedrich Klug in 1830. It is found from Morocco to Egypt and Sudan.

The wingspan is 15–18 mm. The moths are on wing from February to April and from April to September in two generations.

The larvae feed on Acacia raddiana.

Subspecies 
P. b. candens
P. b. bouillonae

References 

 P.C.-Rougeot, P. Viette (1978). Guide des papillons nocturnes d'Europe et d'Afrique du Nord. Delachaux et Niestlé (Lausanne).

Lasiocampidae
Moths described in 1943